The Assumption of Mary Cathedral  is a Romanian Orthodox church in Baia Mare, Romania.

The cornerstone was laid in 1905, the building completed in 1911. In 1930, the church became the cathedral of the new Romanian Catholic Diocese of Maramureș. When the Greek-Catholic Church was outlawed by the communist regime in 1948, the cathedral became a Romanian Orthodox parish. It continues to be used as such, which has led to legal disputes.

References

Former Greek-Catholic churches in Romania
Former cathedrals in Romania
Buildings and structures in Baia Mare
Romanian Orthodox churches in Romania
1911 establishments in Romania